Conny Öhman (19 December 1950September 2010) was a Swedish politician and member of the Riksdag, the national legislature. A member of the Social Democratic Party, he represented Östergötland County between October 1994 and October 2006. He was a member of the county council in Östergötland County from 1976 to 1994. He died in September 2010 aged 59.

References

1950 births
2010 deaths
Members of the Riksdag 1994–1998
Members of the Riksdag 1998–2002
Members of the Riksdag 2002–2006
Members of the Riksdag from the Social Democrats